Kamla Nehru College for Women, Jodhpur is a women's college situated in Jodhpur city in Indian state of Rajasthan. It was established in 1962. The college is affiliated to Jai Narain Vyas University.

See also
 Arid Forest Research Institute (AFRI)

References 

Women's universities and colleges in Rajasthan
Colleges in Jodhpur
Educational institutions established in 1962
1962 establishments in Rajasthan
Memorials to Kamala Nehru